The 1937 Liège–Bastogne–Liège was the 27th edition of the Liège–Bastogne–Liège cycle race and was held on 10 April 1937. The race started and finished in Liège. The race was won by Éloi Meulenberg.

General classification

References

1937
1937 in Belgian sport